Daryll Neita (born 29 August 1996) is a British sprinter. In 2022, she won her first individual international medals, with bronze in the 100 metres at both the European Championships and Commonwealth Games. Neita claimed bronze for the 60 metres at the 2023 European Indoor Championships. She has won several medals as part of Great Britain 4 × 100 m relay teams, including Olympic bronze medals in 2016 and 2021, World Championships silver medals in 2017 and 2019, and European gold in 2018.

Her 60 metres indoor best of 7.05 seconds and 100 metres best of 10.90 seconds achieved at the 2023 ISTAF Indoor and 2022 Commonwealth Games respectively puts her second on the relevant UK all-time lists behind Dina Asher-Smith. Neita is a three-time British national champion, once each outdoors over 100 m and 200 m, and once indoors over 60 m.

Career

2015-19
In 2015, Neita finished fourth in the 100 metres final at the European Junior Championships with a time of 11.69 seconds.

In 2016, she finished second in the event with 11.24 seconds (having run a personal best of 11.23 in the semi-finals) at the British Championships, earning Olympic selection. At about two weeka later at the European Championships, she won a silver medal in the 4 x 100 metres relay. On 22 July, Neita and her teammates Asha Philip, Desiree Henry and Dina Asher-Smith broke the British record in the 4 x 100 metres, with 41.81 seconds. At the 2016 Rio Olympics, Neita was eliminated in the heats of the 100 metres in 11.41, narrowly failing to qualify for the semi-finals. In the sprint relay, she won a bronze medal along with teammates Philip, Henry and Asher-Smith, improving the British record they had set a month earlier with 41.77 seconds. On winning Neita said  "I am speechless. I am so proud of our team. We absolutely smashed it."

On 17 June 2017, Neita improved her 100 metres personal best to 11.20 secs at the England U23 Championships, before going on to finish second at the British Championships on 1 July, running 11.25, earning World Championship selection. A week later at the Anniversary Games in London, she further improved her 100 metres best with 11.14, to move to seventh on the UK all-time list. The following month at the World Championships in London, she ran 11.15 in her 100 metres heat to qualify for the semi-finals, where she was eliminated running 11.16. She went on to win a silver medal in the sprint relay, along with her 2016 Olympic teammates Philip, Henry and Asher-Smith.

In June 2018, Neita ran 11.19 secs to finish second at the British Championships, earning selection for the European Championships in Berlin.  At the Championships she qualified for the semi finials but missed out on the final after finishing 4th in a time of 11.27.

In September 2019, Neita finished in 1st place in the 100m, representing Europe in The Match, a two-day team competition against the USA in Minsk, Belarus. At the World Championships in Doha that year, she improved her 100 metres best to 11.12 secs to reach the semi-finals, where she ran 11.18. She went on to win a silver medal in the 4 × 100m relay.

2020-present
In 2021, after it was announced that her coach Rana Reider was being investigated by the US Center for SafeSport  for sexual misconduct, UK Athletics told Neita and other British athletes who were part of Reider’s group to cease contact with Reider or else her membership in the World Class Programme, including lottery funding, would be suspended. Neita left Reider’s training group thereafter.

In 2022, Neita represented England at the Commonwealth Games in Birmingham, where she set a new personal best of 10.90 in the semi-finals. In the final, she ran 11.07 to finish in third place, winning a bronze medal. The same month, she took a medal of the same colour at the European Championships.

Achievements

International competitions

1Time from the heats; Neita was replaced in the final.

National titles
 British Athletics Championships
 100 metres: 2022
 200 metres: 2022
British Indoor Athletics Championships
60 metres : 2023

References

External links

1996 births
Living people
British female sprinters
Olympic athletes of Great Britain
Athletes (track and field) at the 2016 Summer Olympics
Medalists at the 2016 Summer Olympics
Olympic bronze medallists for Great Britain
Olympic bronze medalists in athletics (track and field)
Black British sportspeople
World Athletics Championships athletes for Great Britain
World Athletics Championships medalists
Athletes from London
Athletes (track and field) at the 2020 Summer Olympics
Medalists at the 2020 Summer Olympics
Olympic female sprinters
Athletes (track and field) at the 2022 Commonwealth Games
Commonwealth Games bronze medallists for England
Commonwealth Games medallists in athletics
European Athletics Championships winners
Medallists at the 2022 Commonwealth Games